From November 1985 to February 1986, a representative team of Australian cricket players undertook a so-called "Rebel tour" to South Africa, to play a series of matches against the South African team. At the time, the International Cricket Conference had placed a moratorium on international cricket teams undertaking tours of the country, due to the South African government's policy of apartheid, leaving South Africa with no international competition.

Background
During the 1980s, the International Cricket Conference (ICC) placed a ban on its members undertaking tours of South Africa in line with the international sporting community's overall boycott. As a means of obtaining quality opposition for the South African cricket team, groups of players from different countries had been approached privately by the governing body of cricket in South Africa to undertake so-called "rebel tours" of the country. The players that accepted the offer did so in the knowledge that they would likely receive significant sanctions from both their own country's governing body and the ICC. The first tour took place in 1982, when an English side spent four weeks in South Africa. Teams representing both Sri Lanka and the West Indies had subsequently made the trip before, in late 1985, the first Australian side was recruited to make a tour.

Squads

The tour was organised by former Australian test batsman Bruce Francis at the behest of the South African cricket board, then led by Ali Bacher. Bacher had planned to invite an Australian team as early as December 1981, but it was July 1984 before Francis approached any players, and October of that year before a meeting was held to plan the tour.

Original players signed for the tour included:
Batsmen – Graham Yallop, Steve Smith, Graeme Wood, Wayne B. Phillips, Andrew Hilditch, Dirk Wellham, John Dyson
Fast bowlers – Terry Alderman, Carl Rackemann, John Maguire, Rod McCurdy, Rodney Hogg
Spin bowlers – Tom Hogan, Murray Bennett 
All-rounder – Peter Faulkner
Wicket-keeper – Steve Rixon

Several players seriously considered joining the tour, including David Hookes and Jeff Thomson, but demanded too much money. Other players were never considered, such as Geoff Lawson, Kim Hughes and Allan Border.

Out of the initial players to sign, only Peter Faulkner and Rod McCurdy (who had represented Australia only in One-Day Internationals) had never represented Australia in Test matches. Several were in the Australian team when they signed to go to Australia and a number of these players were selected for the 1985 tour to England, including Wood, Phillips, Hilditch, Wellham, Alderman, Rixon, Bennett and Rackemann. News of the rebel tour broke before this squad left for England.

Withdrawals
Murray Bennett pulled out of the tour after having second thoughts and being selected for Australia over the 1984–85 summer. Phillips, Wood and Wellham pulled out after a financial inducement from Kerry Packer; Packer also tried to get Steve Smith to change his mind but Smith refused. Hilditch also pulled out after being selected for the Australian team over the 84–85 summer.

Francis signed up several new players including Trevor Hohns, Greg Shipperd, Mick Taylor and Mike Haysman. The tour received its biggest boost in early 1985 when Kim Hughes, who had been dropped from the Australian team, met with Bacher and Francis, agreed to tour and captain the side.

Matches
The tour was scheduled to last for three months, with the touring side arriving in South Africa in November 1985, and the last game scheduled for the start of February 1986. Included on the itinerary was a three match "Test" series and six one-day games, as well as seventeen tour matches against various provincial and other opponents.

Tour matches

One-day matches against Country Districts teams

Three-day matches

One-day matches

Unofficial "Test" matches
The series of three "Test" matches was won 1–0 by South Africa, after the first two matches were drawn and the home team were victorious in the third.  In the third match, the Australians were bowled out for 61 in their 2nd innings, while chasing 250 to win, when both Clive Rice and Garth Le Roux took hat-tricks. As of 2022, two bowlers taking a hat-trick in the same innings has never occurred in official Test matches.  The players of the series were Carl Rackemann for Australia and Clive Rice for South Africa.

First "Test"

Second "Test"

Third "Test"

One-day series
There were six one-day matches: the Australians started well by winning the first two games, but the South Africans recovered and ultimately won the series 4–2.

First match

Second match

Third match

Fourth match

Fifth match

Sixth match

Aftermath
The series was highly controversial in Australia and its Australian participants were banned from interstate cricket for two seasons and international cricket for three seasons.  Many of the players returned to South Africa for a second tour the following year.

Alderman, Rixon, Rackemann, Maguire and McCurdy lost their chance to tour England in 1985 by sticking to their agreement to tour South Africa.

References

External links
Australian XI in South Africa in 1985-86 at Cricinfo
Australian XI in South Africa in 1985-86 at Cricket Archive

1985 in Australian cricket
1985 in South African cricket
1986 in Australian cricket
1986 in South African cricket
Australian cricket tours of South Africa
International cricket competitions from 1985–86 to 1988
Rebel
Cricket and apartheid
Cricket controversies
Controversies in Australia